Hiroyuki Takahashi (born October 30, 1957), is the president of video game developing company Camelot Software Planning. He has directly participated in most of the projects of the company, particularly as a writer, art director, producer and game designer.

Career
Hiroyuki was an employee of Enix and worked on the Dragon Quest franchise, in particular Dragon Quest IV on which he had a significant production role.

Camelot Software Planning
In 1990, he left Enix to form Sega CD4 (Consumer Development Studio #4). They changed their name to Sonic! Software Planning, which was formed to create Shining in the Darkness for the Sega Mega Drive/Genesis alongside Climax Entertainment. The company would be an important part of Shining franchise, developing all the Shining games released in the 1990s. In 1995, the company changed their name to Camelot Software Planning and officially separated from Sega, but agreed to keep developing the Shining games and not release games for rival systems that would hurt the Shining franchise. In late 1998, Sega began focusing their resources on the Dreamcast, leaving the company with their last scenario for Shining Force III for the Sega Saturn in jeopardy. Camelot wrapped up Shining Force III and formed a partnership with Nintendo.

Since joining Nintendo, Camelot have developed many Mario sports games, mainly sticking to golf and tennis games. They have also developed the Golden Sun series of RPGs.

Works

References

External links 
 

1957 births
Living people
Japanese video game designers
Video game writers
Japanese video game producers